The term diaspora language, coined in the 1980s, is a sociolinguistic idea referring to a variety of languages spoken by peoples with common roots who have dispersed, under various pressures and often globally. The emergence and evolution of a diaspora language is usually part of a larger attempt to retain cultural identity.

Examples

Molisanne (Molise Slavic)
Though possessing certain elements of Slavic languages, Molise Slavic is also influenced by Italian. Considered an endangered language, Molise Slavic is spoken by approximately 3,500 people in the villages of Montemitro, San Felice del Molise, and Acquaviva Collecroce in southern Molise, as well as elsewhere in southern Italy.  The language developed as a result of refugees arriving in Italy from the eastern Adriatic coast during the 15th and 16th centuries.

Istro-Romanian
Another diaspora language is Istro-Romanian, spoken by the Istro-Romanians. Like Molise Slavic, it is considered endangered, with only 500 to 1000 speakers remaining.  Istro-Romanian developed when the ancestors of these individuals migrated to Istria from Transylvania (some say Serbia) during the 12th century.

AAVE in the African American Diaspora
A study of African American enclaves in Nova Scotia, Canada and Samaná, Dominican Republic shows a high similarity in the African American Vernacular English (AAVE) spoken there and the early versions of AAVE that originated in the south during the 19th century. AAVE in the United States on the other hand has changed substantially due in part to the Great Migration that happened in the twentieth century. Unusually, while most examples have a diaspora causing differences in language due to influence from another culture and languages, these enclaves maintained a form of language closer to the historical source, or branching point.

Hindlish or Hinglish
The great number of Hindi speakers in the United Kingdom has produced a strain of the language unlike that spoken on the Indian subcontinent where it began.  This has given rise to Hindlish, also known as Hinglish, an informal term for the mixture of Hindi and English that includes such phrases as city kotwali or "city police station."  Hinglish is not considered a full-blown diaspora language but it appears to be developing into one.

Yiddish and the Jewish Diaspora
Yiddish is a major linguistic creation of the Jewish Diaspora, originating in what is now Germany. It is one of many languages that emerged as a result of the migration of the Jewish people throughout Europe, alongside Ladino (Judeo-Spanish), Italkian (Judeo-Italian), Knaanic (Judeo-Slavic), Yevanic (Judeo-Greek), and Zarphatic (Judeo-French). Of these languages, Yiddish produced the most significant literature and served as an icon of Jewish identity throughout Central and Eastern Europe.

Yoruba or Lucumi
The Yoruba language can be found across the globe, on every continent, however enforced migration under colonial slavery resulted in a particular density in the Americas and pressure on Yoruba speakers to adapt or assimilate. In the Caribbean, in particular, Yoruba culture, religion, and language have co-evolved with the needs of the enslaved populations, generating extensive hybridization and surviving into the current era.  The Santeria religion draws its roots from Catholic, Yoruba and Native American spiritual traditions, and its liturgical language is Lucumi, a dialect of the original predominantly Nigerian Yoruba.

Canadian Gaelic
In the aftermath of the Highland and Lowland Clearances, a great number of Scots emigrated to Canada, proportionately more than the other Anglo New World countries of the United States, Australia, and even New Zealand.  They brought with them their language, and while many spoke Scots or English, a great number spoke Gaelic.  It was even debated in the early days of Canadian Confederation whether to make Gaelic (inclusive of both the Scottish and Irish varieties) the third official language of Canada, and, if Irish and Scottish are counted together, Gaelic was the most common native tongue amongst the Fathers of Confederation of Canada, more common than French or English, and the first Canadian Prime Minister, John A. Macdonald, spoke it as his mother tongue.  Canadian Gaelic is considered to be similar to the western dialects of Gaidhlig in Scotland.

Canadian Ukrainian
In the time of the Austro-Hungarian Empire, the province of Galicia was considered the poorest in all of Europe, and was considerably over-populated.  While the western part, containing Warsaw, was more densely populated and better maintained, the eastern part, overwhelmingly Ukrainian, was considered the most backward part of the Empire and good for little more than as a source of troops for the army.  This led to a mass exodus of citizens, along with Ukrainians from the neighbouring region of Bukovina, to Canada, settling primarily in the Western provinces of The Prairies.  They brought with them not just their religion – western Ukrainians are predominately Ukrainian Catholic whereas the rest of Ukraine is largely Eastern Orthodox – but also their language.  To this day, Canadian Ukrainian is clearly reminiscent of the Western dialects, and has minimal influence from Russian (given that it had never been part of the Russian Empire and was only conquered by the Soviet Union after WWII, long after the Canadian Ukrainian community had been established), but proportionately greater influence from Polish and German, such as loanwords.  The Canadian dialect frequently uses English words for technologies or concepts developed since the start of the 20th century, so while vocabulary like "coal" and "shoe" remain the same as their counterparts in Ukraine, newer concepts frequently use English loanwords for items such as "truck" and "cash register."

See also
 Immigrant language
 Heritage language
 Canadian Gaelic
 Creole language

References

Sociolinguistics
 
Diaspora studies